Anna Nanousi is a Greek fashion model and television host.  She has appeared in many Greek and international fashion magazines and events.  Aside from modelling she has also acted in a few Greek movies. Currently Anna is represented by We Models Management, appearing on the covers of numerous fashion magazines. In 2002 she appeared in the B-Horror flick Sentinels of Darkness by Manos Kalaitzakis.

External links

Anna Nanousi on We Models
Beautiful Greek Women

Greek female models
Living people
Year of birth missing (living people)
Models from Athens